Debbie Graham or Debbie Graham Shaffer (born August 25, 1970) is a retired tennis player from the United States.

She was awarded the "Most Impressive Newcomer" by WTA in 1992. She was a "High Performance Coach" for women with the USTA at the USTA Training Center in Carson, California.

She is the director of Little Aces Tennis, where she is teaching children to play tennis with low compression balls, smaller rackets, and smaller nets.

Graham played college tennis for Stanford University. She won the Broderick Award (now the Honda Sports Award) as the nation's top collegiate tennis player in 1990. She was inducted into the Stanford Hall of Fame in 1997 for winning NCAAA singles her sophomore year and only losing one match on an undefeated team.

WTA career finals

Singles: 1 (0–1)

Doubles: 9 (5–4)

References

External links
 
 

1970 births
Living people
American female tennis players
Stanford Cardinal women's tennis players
Place of birth missing (living people)
Tennis people from California